The Aitareya Brahmana is the Brahmana of the Shakala Shakha of the Rigveda, an ancient Indian collection of sacred hymns. This work, according to the tradition, is ascribed to Mahidasa Aitareya.

Authorship 

Sayana of Vijayanagara, a 14th century commentator, attributes the entire Aitareya Brahmana to a single man: Mahidasa Aitareya. In his introduction to the text, Sayana suggests that "Aitareya" is a matronymic name. Mahidasa's mother was "Itaraa" (इतरा), whose name is derived from the Sanskrit word "itara". She was one of the wives of a great rishi (sage). The rishi preferred sons from his other wives over Mahidasa. Once he placed all his other sons on his lap, but ignored Mahidasa. On seeing tears in the eyes of her son, Itara prayed to the earth goddess Bhūmi, her kuladevi (tutelary deity). Bhūmi then appeared and gifted Mahidasa the knowledge contained in the Aitareya Brahmana.

Mahidasa is mentioned in other works before Sayana, such as the Chandogya Upanishad (3.16.7) and the Aitareya Aranyaka (2.1.7, 3.8). But none of these works mention Sayana's legend. The Aitareya Aranyaka is undoubtedly a composite work, and it is possible that the Aitareya Brahmana also had multiple authors. According to AB Keith, the present redaction of the work may be ascribed to Mahidasa, but even that cannot be said conclusively.

Identification with Asvalayana Brahmana 

The Asvalayana Srautasutra and Asvalayana Grhyasutra, attributed to the sage Asvalayana, are the srautasutra and grhyasutra associated with the Aitareya Brahmana. Some Sanskrit texts also mention a text called Asvalayana Brahmana. For example, Raghunandana (c. 16th century CE), in his Malamasatattva, quotes a verse from what he calls the Asvalayana Brahmana. The verse is a slight variation of an Aitareya Brahmana verse.

The common view is that the Asvalayana Brahmana is simply another name for the Aitareya Brahmana. However, according to another theory, it might be a now-lost, similar but distinct Brahmana text.

Date of composition 

The Aitareya Brahmana with some certainty dates to the 1st millennium BCE, likely to its first half. 
Published estimates include the following:
The translator of the Brāhmaṇa, A. B. Keith (1920), presented detailed arguments for a date in the 6th century BCE.
 H. H. Wilson (1866): "about 6 centuries B.C.".
 John G. R. Forlong (1906): "not later than 700 B.C."
 E. J. Rapson (1995): "possibly c. 500 B.C." for the "later books of the Aitareya Brahmana"
 Franklin Southworth (2004), referencing Krishnamurti (2003): "c. 7th century BCE"
 Jan N. Bremmer (2007): "c. 800 BC"

Contents
Forty adhyayas (chapters) of this work are grouped under eight pañcikās (group of five). The following is an overview of its contents:
 Pañcikā I
 Adhyāya I: The consecration rites
 Adhyāya II: The introductory sacrifice
 Adhyāya III: The buying and bringing of the Soma
 Adhyāya IV: The Pravargya
 Adhyāya V: The carrying forward of fire, Soma, and the offerings to the High Altar
 Pañcikā II
 Adhyāya I: The animal sacrifice
 Adhyāya II: The animal sacrifice and morning litany
 Adhyāya III: The Aponaptriya and other ceremonies
 Adhyāya IV: The cups of Indra and Vayu, Mitra and Varuna and the Ashvins
 Adhyāya V: The Ajya Shastra 
 Pañcikā III
 Adhyāya I: The Prauga Shastra, the Vashat call and the Nivids
 Adhyāya II: The Marutvatiya and the Nishkevalya Shastra
 Adhyāya III: The Vaishvadeva and the Agnimaruta
 Adhyāya IV: General considerations regarding the Agnishtoma
 Adhyāya V: Certain details regarding the sacrifice
 Pañcikā IV
 Adhyāya I: The Shodashin and the Atiratra sacrifices
 Adhyāya II: The Ashvina Shastra and Gavam Ayana
 Adhyāya III: The Shadahas and the Vishuvant
 Adhyāya IV: The Dvadashaha rite
 Adhyāya V: The first two days of the Dvadashaha
 Pañcikā V
 Adhyāya I: The third and fourth days of the Dvadashaha
 Adhyāya II: The fifth and sixth days of the Dvadashaha
 Adhyāya III: The seventh and eighth days of the Dvadashaha
 Adhyāya IV: The ninth and tenth days of the Dvadashaha
 Adhyāya V: The Agnihotra and the Brahmana priest
 Pañcikā VI
 Adhyāya I: The office of the Gravastut and Subrahmanya
 Adhyāya II: The Shastras of the Hotrakas at Satras and Ahinas
 Adhyāya III: Miscellaneous points as to the Hotrakas
 Adhyāya IV: The Sampata hymns, the Valakhilyas and the Durohana
 Adhyāya V: The Shilpa Shastras of the third pressing
 Pañcikā VII
 Adhyāya I: The distribution of the portions of the victim of the sacrifice
 Adhyāya II: Expiations of the errors in the sacrifice
 Adhyāya III: The narrative of Shunahshepa
 Adhyāya IV: The preparations for the royal consecretation
 Adhyāya V: The sacrificial drink of the king
 Pañcikā VIII
 Adhyāya I: The Stotras and Shastras of the Soma day
 Adhyāya II: The anointing of the king
 Adhyāya III: The great anointing of Indra
 Adhyāya IV: The great anointing of the king
 Adhyāya V: The office of Purohita

Cosmography 

Section 2.7
Astronomy played a significant role in Vedic rituals, which were conducted at different periods of a year. The Aitareya Brahmana (4.18) states the sun stays still for a period of 21 days, and reaches its highest point on vishuvant, the middle day of this period. The gods feared that at this point, the sun would lose its balance, so they tied it with five ropes (the five "ropes" being five prayer verses). The vishuvant is mentioned as an important day for rituals. The text also mentions that the sun burns with the greatest force after passing the meridian.

The Aitareya Brahmana (2.7) states:

According to Subhash Kak, this implies that according to the author of the verse, the sun does not move and it is the earth that moves, suggesting heliocentrism and rotation of a spherical Earth. According to Jyoti Bhusan Das Gupta, this verse implies that the author "clearly understood that days and nights were local rather than a global phenomenon". Das Gupta adds that the text's interest in the sun's position appears to be "purely ritualistic", and the verse cannot be conclusively taken as an evidence of the author's recognition of the earth as a sphere. According to K. C. Chattopadhyaya, the verse simply implies that the sun has two sides: one bright and the other dark.

Section 3.44
In section 3.44, among other things, the Aitareya Brahmana states (translation by Haug):

Aitareya Brahmana being a Vedic corpus text and scripture in Hinduism, and the lack of any Mount Meru theories in that text, the medieval era commentators such as Sayana had significant difficulty in reconciling the Vedic era and medieval era cosmographic theories. The medieval era Indian scholars kept the spherical and disc shape cosmography in the Puranas, while the astronomy (Siddhanta) texts for time keeping assumed the spherical assumptions.

In linguistics
The king and the god is a text based on the "king Harishcandra" episode (7.14 … 33.2) of Aitareya Brahmana. It has been used to compare different reconstructions of Proto-Indo-European language.

References

Brahmanas